"For Ol' Times Sake'" is a song by Tony Joe White, covered in 1973 by Elvis Presley.

It was written by Tony Joe White, who originally released it on his 1973 album Homemade Ice Cream. His other songs covered by Presley are "Polk Salad Annie" and "I've Got a Thing About You Baby".

Elvis recorded it at Stax Recording Studios in Memphis, Tennessee. on July 23, 1973.

Elvis Presley's version was first released in 1973 on a single with "Raised on Rock" on the other side. Both songs were then included on the album Raised on Rock / For Ol' Times Sake.

The single "Raised on Rock" / "For Ol' Times Sake" (listed by Billboard as a double-A-sided hit) reached number 41 on the Billboard Hot 100 on the week of October 27, 1973.

In addition, the song "For Ol' Times Sake" reached number 42 on the Billboard Hot Country Singles on the week of November 24.

Charts

References

External links 
 Elvis Presley – Raised On Rock / For Ol' Times Sake on Discogs
 Further reading
 Elvis' (not quite) Memphis Soul Album at WKNO FM

1973 songs
1973 singles
Elvis Presley songs
RCA Records singles
Songs written by Tony Joe White
Rock ballads
Country ballads